Selo pri Moravčah is a settlement in the Municipality of Moravče in central Slovenia. It lies on the main road to Dob west of Moravče. The area is part of the traditional region of Upper Carniola. It is now included with the rest of the municipality in the Central Slovenia Statistical Region.

Name
Selo pri Moravčah was attested in historical sources as Zeell in 1417 and Sell in 1458. The name of the settlement was changed from Selo to Selo pri Moravčah in 1955.

References

External links

Selo pri Moravčah on Geopedia

Populated places in the Municipality of Moravče